Koupalu (also, Koubaru or Koubru) is a primordial deity in Meitei mythology and religion. He is the Guardian of the North West direction. Legend says he is the founder of civilization in Ancient Manipur, starting from the Mount Koubru, a peak where he abodes, in north-western Manipur.

God Koubru resides in the Mount Koubru (Koubru Hill). The Mount Koubru (Koubru Hill) is the first place of settlement of the Meitei ethnicity, including the Lois of Andro, Khurkhul, Phayeng and Sekmai.

Origin 
The traditional hymns supplement the theory of origin. 
Awang Koubru Assupa
Leimalai Khunda Ahanba.
Nongthrei Ma-U Lingliba, 
Irik Mapan Thariba, 
Lainingthou! 
English translation of the above passage:
North Koubru all-inclusive (pervasive)
Leima Lai first habitation,
Heaven-flower all things seen established,
Blood drop (Blood cell) planters,
O! Lainingthou (King of Gods)!
This is the hymn of invocation of God Koubru (Koupalu in PuYas).

Description 
Lord Koupalu (Koubru) is the Omniscient and the Omnipotent Guardian God. He lives on the top of Mount Koubru.
God Koubru, the Heavenly Lord, is said to be the controller of the nine underground wells/tunnels. These are associated with the birth and death of the mankind. The 9 tunnels are sacred to the Meitei people. So, these are still worshipped by the Meiteis.

Worship 
In the Lai Haraoba festival, a ritualistic folk song dedicated to God Koubru is sung like this:
Awang Koubru Assupa
Eeyen Khunda Ahanba
English translation of the above passage:
Koubru of the North, 
You are the overlord
You are the first place of settlement.
The Meiteis offer a beautiful puppy to God Koubru to free themselves from the sufferings.
The Loi caste of the Meitei ethnicity worship God Koubru on every occasion, including birth, marriage and death. All the Loi villagers excluding Andro are the worshipers of God Koubru.

See also 
 Marjing – north east protector
 Thangjing – south west protector
 Wangbren – south east protector

References

External links 

 INTERNET ARCHIVE
 E-pao.net

Animal deities
Animal gods

Arts gods

Creator gods
\
Earth gods

Guardians of the directions

Hunting gods
Kings in Meitei mythology

Love and lust gods

Maintenance gods

Marriage gods
Meitei deities
Names of God in Sanamahism

Nature gods
Ningthou

Pastoral gods
Peace deities
Peace gods

Sky and weather gods

Time and fate gods

Trickster gods

Wind gods